China's Next Top Model Season 4 (also referred to as "Cycle 4") is the fourth installment of the Chinese Reality TV series and is a spin-off of the internationally popular America's Next Top Model. The series began airing on television on October 12, 2013.

The prizes for this cycle were a contract to host China's Travel Channel, a contract with 2pm model management, an appearance on the cover of Grazia China, a cash prize of RMB 1,000,000, a two-week all-expenses paid trip to Europe, the opportunity to walk in Paris Fashion Week in 2014, and a wide variety of gifts worth a total of RMB 500,000 from the show's sponsors.

The winner was 21-year-old Wang Xiao Qian.

Contestants

(ages stated are at start of contest)

 Wang Xiao Ting and Wang Xiao Qian are identical twin sisters, however they competed individually.

Episodes

Episode 1
First aired: October 12, 2013

The 14 girls moved into the model house where they had to fight for the 12 beds in the house. Yin Fang Bing and Li Qiao Dan were slower than the others and did not get beds. Ultimately, Yu An Qi and Zong Yi Tong offered to share with them.

For the challenge, the girls learned how to walk on the runway. Yu An Qi won the challenge for having the best walk and her prize was a RMB 20,000 prize package containing a luxury bag, Gucci sunglasses, and clothing.

For the week's photo shoot, the girls had a Winter Olympics themed shoot in the ice room of Beijing I Sweep Curling Club.

First call-out: Yu An Qi
Bottom three: Chen Qi, Xie Shu Ya, and Yin Fang Bing
Eliminated: Chen Qi and Yin Fang Bing
Photographer: Hua Yuan

Episode 2
First aired: October 19, 2013

The 12 girls received makeovers and competed in a runway challenge where only the top 9 girls would be able to walk in a "Bread n Butter" fashion show. Zong Yi Tong, Xia Fan, and Zhou Chen Lan lost the challenge and watched the other girls walk in the fashion show.

At home, Chen Lan found a frog and used it to scare the other girls, causing Hu Huan to burst into tears. 

The girls had to re-create famous Chinese beauty shots for their photo shoot of the week.

First call-out: Wang Xiao Qian
Bottom two: Xia Fan and Zong Yi Tong
Eliminated: Xia Fan
Photographer: Zhang Hao Ran

Episode 3
First aired: October 26, 2013

The 11 girls had a fancy dinner with judge Zheng Yuan Chang. Afterwards, they went to a hutong where they competed in the week's challenge. 

The girls were randomly split into four teams. Each team had to compose and shoot three street shots with foreigners in under 15 minutes.

Team 1: Shi Xin Ling, Wang Xiao Qian, and Wang Xiao Ting
Team 2: Chen Chan Lin, Yu An Qi, and Chen Lan
Team 3: Dang Zhu Xi, Li Qiao Dan, and Zong Yi Tong
Team 4: Hu Huan and Xie Shu Ya

Team 2 had the best picture, but the overall winner of the challenge was Team 1. Team 1 shares a RMB 20,000 prize package from i-xiu.com and each  one received a watch from Galtiscopio.

The girls went home and received a nutrition lesson from nutritionist Cecile. They learned what foods each blood type is fit to eat. 

Huan cuts her foot while playing hide-and-seek with the other girls in the house.

The girls went to a desert in the Shapotou District in Ningxia where they had to wear swimsuits and work with male models for the photo shoot of the week.

First call-out: Shi Xin Ling
Bottom two: Wang Xiao Ting and Chen Chan Lin
Eliminated: Chen Chan Lin
Photographer: Kevin

Episode 4
First aired: November 2, 2013

The 10 remaining girls were relaxing in the model house when Zhuo Chen Lan kicked Shi Xin Ling while they were playing. This caused Shi Xin Ling to get angry and cry. After Chen Lan's apology, Li Qiao Dan's baby daughter visited the house.

The next morning, the girls found out they were going on a Royal Caribbean International luxury cruise trip to South Korea for 3 days. On the cruise ship, Xin Ling got a chance to show off her dancing skills. 

The girls arrived at Myeong-dong in the Jung District, Seoul, where they had their first challenge. The girls received ₩100,000 (about RMB 573.30) and had 15 minutes to buy one vacation-themed accessory. Afterwards, they returned to the cruise ship where they walked a runway wearing swimsuits and modeling the accessory they bought. Dang Zhu Xi and Yu An Qi were deemed as having the worst accessories, while Qiao Dan wins for best, most vacation-themed accessory. 

The girls then participated in a 2nd challenge where they had to repeat the runway show from the 1st challenge but this time in front of the cruise staff. Additionally, they had to coordinate a dance with a professional dancer at the end of the runway. The cruise staff voted for which model they thought walked and danced the best. Qiao Dan won the 2nd challenge as well. For winning both challenges, Qiao Dan received a RMB 20,000 gift card to shop at Galeries Lafayette.

The girls then returned to Beijing where they had their photo shoot of the week. The photos from this shoot were published in the January 2014 issue of China's Self magazine. Model-turned-designer Alina told the girls that Pandora's Box was the theme of the shoot and that they will be modeling her Ali-Hang haute couture collection. The focus of the episode was posing, so the girls were asked to create strong, long, lean, fairy-like poses for this shoot. After the shoot, Qiao Dan found out that her daughter had a fever. At the judging, the girls complained to the staff backstage about the judges' choosing of the photos.

Photographer: Chen Bo Yu
First call-out: Shi Xin Ling
Bottom two: Chen Lan and Zong Yi Tong
Eliminated: Zong Yi Tong

Episode 5
First aired: November 9, 2013

The 9 girls are visited at the house by famous actress Fan Wen Fang and received an acting lesson. The girls are paired up and each pair has to speak a phrase to their partner in the emotion they are given. Afterwards, the girls must dress up as a variety of housewives and act out a scene where they must say they are China's Next Top Model.  

Dang Zhu Xi let the girls know that her break from university is almost up, and she was debating whether to take a year off and stay in the competition, or to quit and leave. The girls voted on what they thought she should do and a majority of them voted for her leaving, but Zhu Xi had not made up her mind yet.  

The girls then had their challenge of the week where the girls had to create a breast cancer commercial for the Aimer Foundation. The 9 girls were split up into 3 teams. The criteria were that they had to be topless, must use 3 keywords, and must write, direct, and act their commercial together in 15 minutes. 
Team 1: Dang Zhu Xi, Li Qiao Dan, and Wang Xiao Ting
Team 2: Hu Huan, Wang Xiao Qian, and Yu An Qi
Team 3: Shi Xin Ling, Xie Shu Ya, and Chen Lan
Team 1 went first, and Zhu xX was criticized for not doing enough in her segment. Team 2 went second and Huan and An Qi were criticized for being too cold. Team 3 went last and was criticized for not using key words under Shu Ya's direction; Xin Ling was also criticized for overthinking her segment. Overall, the winner of the challenge was Team 1. Their prize was a gift bag containing clothes from Galeries Lafayette worth RMB 30,000 split among the three of them. 

Back at the house, Zhu Xi got upset that she had only RMB 5000 worth of clothes from the gift bag and confronted Qiao Dan and Xiao Ting about it. 

Next, the girls had to model as vintage American housewives, or Desperate Housewives, for their photo shoot of the week. Their photos were published in the 12th issue of L'Officiel China magazine. The girls were split into groups and each group was given a scene to act out in their shots for the magazine.
Rich beauty queens doing each other's make-up: Wang Xiao Qian and Wang Xiao Ting
Haughty housewives competing with each other: Hu Huan and Yu An Qi
Heartbroken housewife complaining to impatient housewife doing chores: Dang Zhu Xi and Li Qiao Dan
Two gossiping housewives with angry housewife overhearing them: Shi Xin Ling, Xie Shu Ya, and Zhuo Chen Lan
After the photo shoot, the girls found out 2 will be eliminated and cried over this. At the judging, Xin Ling was not present because of a health issue, but later recovered and joined the girls in the judging room. When put up for judging, Zhu Xi quit the competition to go back to school. As a result, only 1 more would be eliminated. The girls broke down into tears over the most heartbreaking elimination of the season.
Photographer:  Zhang Xi
First call-out: Yu An Qi
Bottom two: Li Qiao Dan & Wang Xiao Ting
Eliminated: Wang Xiao Ting

Episode 6
First aired: November 16, 2013

This episode is a finale runway special where all 14 finalists are shown walking in the final runway show. Tyra Banks is also present at this final runway to help China's NTM's host and judges decide on the winner. No winner deliberation is shown and there is no elimination.

Episode 7
First aired: November 23, 2013

First call-out: Li Qiao dan	
Bottom two: Shi Xin ling	& Xie Shu ya	
Eliminated: Shi Xin ling

Episode 8
First aired: November 30, 2013

First call-out: Wang Xiao qian	
Bottom two: Li Qiao dan & Yu An qi	
Eliminated: Li Qiao dan

Episode 9
First aired: December 7, 2013

First call-out: Wang Xiao qian	
Bottom two: Yu An qi & Chen lan			  
Eliminated: Chen lan

Episode 10
First aired: December 14, 2013

First call-out: Hu Huan	
Bottom two: Xie Shu ya & Yu An qi		  
Eliminated: None

Episode 11
First aired: December 21, 2013

This episode recaps the previous episodes.

Episode 12
First aired: December 28, 2013

First eliminated: Xie Shu ya	
Second eliminated: Hu Huan	
Final two: Wang Xiao qian & Yu An qi		  
China's Next Top Model: Wang Xiao qian

Summaries

Call-out order

 The contestant was eliminated
 The contestant quit the competition
 The contestant was part of a non-elimination bottom two
 The contestant won the competition
 In episode 1, Shu Ya, Fang Bing, and Qi landed in the bottom three. Shang Wen Jie handed the final photograph to Shu Ya, eliminating the other two contestants.
 In episode 5, Zhu Xi quit the competition during judging.
 Episode 6 was a special episode where the final runway was shown. The winner was not revealed until the final episode, after the regular competition resumed.
 In episode 10, An Qi and Shu Ya landed in the bottom two. None of them was eliminated.
 Episode 11 was the recap episode.

Average call-out order
Final two are not included.

Photo shoot guide
Episode 1 photo shoot: Olympic sports 
Episode 2 photo shoot: Re-creating famous beauty shots
Episode 3 photo shoot: Steamy couples in the desert
Episode 4 photo shoot: Eccentric woodland elves
Episode 5 photo shoot: Desperate housewives
Episode 7 photo shoot: Underwater goddesses
Episode 8 photo shoot: ONLY Lookbook with animals
Episode 9 photo shoot: Lingerie inspired by the Chinese opera
Episode 10 photo shoots: Cliff editorial; resting on the beach in B&W
Episode 12 photo shoot: Grazia covers

References

External links

2013 Chinese television seasons
China's Next Top Model